Sydir Vasylyovych Kizin  (born November 15, 1975, Zhytomyr) is a Ukrainian lawyer and politician, former Head of Zhytomyr State administration - governor of Zhytomyr oblast.

Biography 

Was born in the city of Lviv, Western Ukraine.

From 1982 to 1991 Kizin studied at school number 23 in Zhytomyr.

Kizin participated in the national revival of the late 1980s and early 1990s in the Zhytomyr region, attended meetings of the Taras Shevchenko Society of Ukrainian Language and took part in such events as "Chain of Unity" and the student's hunger strike in 1990 in Kyiv.

In 1992–1998 he studied at the Faculty of Law in the Ivan Franko National University of Lviv, obtained the qualification of lawyer.

Since March 1994 Kizin worked on different positions in the district court.
Since 1996 he worked in the Department of justice.

In 1998–2002, Kizin worked at the Securities and Stock Market State Commission (SSMSC) as an assistant to the Head of the State Commission, than as Deputy Head of Legal Department of Securities and Stock Market State Commission of Ukraine.

In 2002 Kizin started his own law practice. Kizin passed Bar exam, received the advocate's Certificate and became a member of the Zhytomyr Regional Bar Association.

From 2003 to 2007 he was a partner of the Law Firm "Kizin, Chibisov and Partners".

2007-2014  Kizin was a partner of the Lawyers Association "Bondarchuk, Kizin and Partners".

From 2020 Sydir Kizin is a partner of "Senators" advocates union (Kyiv), and Kizin Chibisov & Partners Law Firm.

Membership in the Ukrainian and international professional associations 

Since 2002 Kizin is a member of the Zhytomyr Regional Bar Association.
In 2006 member of the European Business Association (EBA).
In March 2007 he joined the Ukrainian-American Bar Association (UABA).

Public and political activity 

In 2009 Kizin became a co-founder of the Public Organization "Lustration".
Since 2009 he is a member of the All-Ukrainian Union "Svoboda", Deputy Head of the Legal Department. During this period on a cost-free basis he has hold dozens of high-profile trials in defense of political prisoners, opposition journalists and civic activists. Among them – Olena Bilozerska , Mykola Kokhanivskiy, Vitaliy Zaporozhets , Andriy Korenivskiy, Olena Halahuza, Roman Orynovskiy  and many others.

In 2012 at the parliamentary elections Sydir Kizin was the candidate to Verkhovna Rada (Ukrainian Parliament) from united political forces - Al-Ukrainian Union "Batkivshchyna" (Yulia Tymoshenko), and "Svoboda" (Oleh Tiahnybok"). Kizin had second result with 22.06% of votes. 

March 2014 - July 2014 Sydir Kizin worked at the position of the Head of Zhytomyr Regional State administration (Governor of Zhytomyr oblast https://en.wikipedia.org/wiki/Governor_of_Zhytomyr_Oblast).
	
In the 2014 parliamentary election Kizin was 21st on the election list of his party; since the party came 0,29% short to overcome the 5% threshold to win seats on the nationwide list he was not elected into parliament.

In 2015 Kizin participated the election of Mayor of Zhytomyr.

In 2015 Sydir Kizin was elected to Regional Council (local parliament) of Zhytomyr oblast. In 2015-2020 he was the Head of Justice and Rule of law Commission of Regional Council.    

From 2020 Sydir Kizin is a partner of "Senators" advocates union (Kyiv), and Kizin Chibisov & Partners Law Firm.

Family 
In 2008 Sydir Kizin married to Marianna Kizina (born 1984). They have 3 children: Ustym (2008), Lev (2014) and Platon (2017).

References

1975 births
Living people
20th-century Ukrainian lawyers
21st-century Ukrainian lawyers
Governors of Zhytomyr Oblast
Politicians from Zhytomyr
People of the Revolution on Granite
People of the Euromaidan
University of Lviv alumni